Mel Lucas is a former college baseball coach and college administrator.  He served as head coach of the Troy Trojans baseball team before being hired as the first athletic director at South Alabama, then a new university in Mobile, Alabama.  He served as the school's first baseball coach for four seasons before hiring former major leaguer Eddie Stanky in order to focus on his growing administrative duties.  Lucas was instrumental in forming the Sun Belt Conference and was a central figure in the growth of the Jaguars athletic programs.  He was inducted into the school's hall of fame in 1989.

References

Living people
South Alabama Jaguars athletic directors
South Alabama Jaguars baseball coaches
Troy Trojans baseball coaches
Year of birth missing (living people)